Karamuck  is a village in Thrissur district in the state of Kerala, India.

Demographics
 India census, Karamuck had a population of 14049 with 6703 males and 7346 females.

References

Villages in Thrissur district